The Archaeological Museum of Thera is a museum in Fira, Santorini, Greece. It was built in 1960 to replace an older one which had collapsed by the 1956 Amorgos earthquake.

Its collection houses artifacts that begin from Proto-Cycladic marble figurines of the 3rd millennium BC, and continue on to the Classical period.

There are prehistoric vases from Akrotiri dated to the 20th-17th centuries BC.

Later artifacts include pottery and amphorae of Geometric and Archaic periods. Many of these objects come from the ancient cemetery of Thera. One of them is a krater with Attic black figures from grave no. 1, with four ships on the internal surface, around the rim.

External links

Archaeological Museum of Thera. Hellenic Ministry of Culture and Tourism.

Thera
Buildings and structures in Santorini
Museums established in 1960
Thera